Hunter-killer may refer to:

Military terminology
 Hunter-killer team, a team that separates the tasks of "hunting" and "killing" to two or more individuals
 Hunter-killer armored-vehicle team, scout vehicles and tanks operating in concert as "hunters" and "killers"
 Hunter-killer sight, a vehicle commander's sight, independent of the gunner's sight
 Attack submarine or hunter-killer submarine
 USAF Hunter-Killer program developing unmanned combat air vehicles
 Hunter-killer Group, World War II formation of Allied warships usually including an escort carrier (CVE), tasked with locating and sinking enemy submarines

Other
 Hunter Killer (film), a 2018 film
 Hunter Killer (video game), a 1989 video game
 Hunter-Killer (comics), a comic book series
 688(I) Hunter/Killer, 1997 submarine simulator game developed by Sonalysts Inc. and published by Electronic Arts